Fernando Gabriel Regulés (born October 17, 1973 in Buenos Aires, Argentina) is a former Argentine footballer who has played for clubs in Argentina, Chile, Ecuador, Paraguay and Honduras.

References
 

1973 births
Living people
Footballers from Buenos Aires
Association football goalkeepers
Argentine footballers
Argentine expatriate footballers
San Lorenzo de Almagro footballers
Club Atlético Independiente footballers
Club Atlético Douglas Haig players
Chacarita Juniors footballers
Club Atlético Temperley footballers
Sportivo Luqueño players
Santiago Wanderers footballers
S.D. Aucas footballers
C.D. Marathón players
Club Atlético Colegiales (Argentina) players
Guaraní Antonio Franco footballers
Expatriate footballers in Chile
Expatriate footballers in Ecuador
Expatriate footballers in Honduras
Expatriate footballers in Paraguay
Liga Nacional de Fútbol Profesional de Honduras players